The Cyprus Football Association (CFA) is the governing body of football in Cyprus and is based in Nicosia. It organizes the football championships, whose top league is the Cypriot First Division. It also organizes the Cypriot Cup, the Cypriot Super Cup and the Cypriot national football team. Cyprus Football Association is also responsible for organizing all the futsal competitions, like the Cypriot Futsal league, the Cypriot Futsal Cup and the Cypriot Futsal Super Cup.

Organized football was introduced to Cyprus early in the 20th century by the British. Initially played in the island's schools, it proved hugely popular and a number of clubs were duly formed. As football became established, the clubs were united in agreeing that an official body was needed to regulate the sport. On 23 September 1934, the Cyprus Football Association was founded by the following eight clubs: AEL Limassol, Anorthosis Famagusta, APOEL, Aris Limassol, EPA Larnaca, Olympiakos Nicosia, Lefkoşa Türk Spor Kulübü and Trust. After Cyprus Football Association's establishment football began to be played on an official basis with the CFA organizing various championships for its member clubs. It became FIFA member in 1948 and UEFA member in 1962.

In 2007, Cyprus Football Association moved to its new headquarters in Nicosia. The opening ceremony was attended by UEFA president Michel Platini, and the president of Cyprus, Tassos Papadopoulos.

Over the last decade more and more teams often criticize the organisation about setting up fixed games and having biased referees at fixtures. Most of the football fans in Cyprus dislike the organisation mostly because their own teams criticize the association. The teams and fans often exaggerate referee mistakes although some so called mistakes do raise questions.

Notable people
Chris Georgiades

References

External links
Official Website
 Cyprus at UEFA.com
 Cyprus at UEFA.org
Cyprus at FIFA.com

Association
Association
Football Association
Cyprus
Association
Sports organizations established in 1934
Sport in Nicosia